This is a list of legislatures of the Italian Republic.

References
Graziano Galassi, La Costituzione e le vicende politico-istituzionali italiane dal 1946 al 1994 (available on LiberLiber)

External links
Italian Ministry of the Interior – Elections

Legislatures of the Italian Republic
 
Italian Republic